Mikuláš Maník (born 26 May 1975), is a Slovak chess Grandmaster (GM) (2006), Slovak Chess Championship winner (2003).

Biography
In 2000s Mikuláš Maník was one of the leading Slovak chess players. In 2003, he won Slovak Chess Championship. Mikuláš Maník has achieved many successes in international chess tournaments, winning or sharing first places among others in Lázně Bohdaneč (1996), Litomyšl (1997), Tatranská Lomnica (1998), Pardubice (1998), Tatrzańskie Zręby (2001), Vienna (2003), Prešov (2004), Česká Třebová (2006).

Mikuláš Maník played for Slovakia in the Chess Olympiads:
 In 2002, at third reserve board in the 35th Chess Olympiad in Bled (+2, =3, -1),
 In 2004, at reserve board in the 36th Chess Olympiad in Calvià (+4, =5, -2).

Mikuláš Maník played for Slovakia in the European Team Chess Championship:
 In 1999, at fourth board in the 12th European Team Chess Championship in Batumi (+2, =4, -3).

In 2006, he was awarded the FIDE Grandmaster (GM) title.

References

External links

Mikuláš Maník chess games at 365chess.com

1975 births
Living people
Sportspeople from Košice
Slovak chess players
Chess grandmasters
Chess Olympiad competitors